Adonis Enmanuel Rosa (born November 17, 1994) is a Dominican professional baseball pitcher who is currently a free agent. He has played in Major League Baseball (MLB) for the New York Yankees.

Career

New York Yankees
Rosa signed with the New York Yankees as an international free agent on December 19, 2013. He made his professional debut in 2014 with the Dominican Summer League Yankees, going 1–0 with a 1.62 ERA in 39 innings. He spent the 2015 season with the Pulaski Yankees, going 7–2 with a 3.93 ERA in 55 innings. His 2016 season was split between the Staten Island Yankees and the Charleston RiverDogs, combining to go 4–6 with a 2.19 ERA in 78 innings. He split the 2017 season between Charleston, the Tampa Yankees, and the Scranton/Wilkes-Barre RailRiders, going a combined 8–3 with a 3.06 ERA in 111.2 innings. His 2018 season was split between Tampa, the Trenton Thunder, and Scranton/Wilkes-Barre, going a combined 14–6 with a 3.93 ERA in 127 innings. In 2019, he has split the season between Trenton and Scranton/Wilkes-Barre.  

On August 13, 2019, the Yankees selected Rosa's contract and promoted him to the major leagues. He made his major league debut that night versus the Baltimore Orioles, pitching two innings in relief. He was optioned back to Triple-A Scranton/Wilkes-Barre the following day. Rosa was designated for assignment and outrighted to AAA on September 13, 2019. Rosa was released by the Yankees organization on September 5, 2020.

Olmecas de Tabasco
On July 15, 2021, Rosa signed with the Olmecas de Tabasco of the Mexican League. In 3 appearances, he posted a 0–1 record with a 13.50 ERA over 6 innings pitched. He was released on August 5, 2021.

Washington Wild Things
On February 17, 2022, Rosa signed with the Washington Wild Things of the Frontier League. On December 5, 2022, Rosa was released by the Wild Things by having his contract option declined.

References

External links

1994 births
Living people
People from Santiago de los Caballeros
Dominican Republic expatriate baseball players in the United States
Major League Baseball players from the Dominican Republic
Major League Baseball pitchers
New York Yankees players
Dominican Summer League Yankees players
Pulaski Yankees players
Staten Island Yankees players
Charleston RiverDogs players
Gigantes del Cibao players
Tampa Yankees players
Trenton Thunder players
Scranton/Wilkes-Barre RailRiders players
Olmecas de Tabasco players
Dominican Republic expatriate baseball players in Mexico